Michael Levin (born 1943) is an American philosopher.

Michael Levin may also refer to: 
Michael Levin (biologist) (born 1969), American biologist
Michael Levin (soldier) (1984–2006), American soldier in the Israel Defense Forces
Michael Graubart Levin (born 1958), American author
Mike Levin (born 1978), American politician from California
Mike Levin (paediatrician), British professor of paediatrics